Andreas Beyeler (born 25 June 1942) is a Swiss former sports shooter. He competed in the 300 m rifle, three positions event at the 1972 Summer Olympics.

References

1942 births
Living people
Swiss male sport shooters
Olympic shooters of Switzerland
Shooters at the 1972 Summer Olympics
Place of birth missing (living people)